The Monkseaton shootings occurred on 30 April 1989 in Monkseaton, Tyne & Wear, United Kingdom, when Robert Sartin killed one man and left 16 other people injured during a 20-minute shooting spree.

Shootings
Sartin, a 22-year-old clerk, took his father's double-barrelled shotgun and climbed into a car outside his parents’ home at around 11.40am. Witnesses described how Sartin fired indiscriminately at people. 

Judith Rhodes was driving along nearby Pykerley Road. As she drove along she noticed a figure dressed entirely in black. She then noticed the double-barrelled shotgun that the man was pointing at her. The first shot shattered the windscreen while the second shot struck her hand, the man then walked calmly away. 

Lorraine Noble, 39, was then shot as she fled from Sartin on Windsor Road, she had been chatting to Frank Roberts when they spotted the gun. Lorraine ran to her house but was shot and badly injured, Frank threw himself to the ground.

Then Joan Kernaghan, her husband James, and a neighbour William Dack were all shot at as they stood chatting in the street. Kenneth Mackintosh was then shot and killed on Windsor Road, once up close the gunman shot his victim twice in the back, killing him. Robert Wilson, 38, was looking for his girlfriend, Sartin shot him in the face and back. Robert’s body was peppered with 60 pellets, 50 of which could not be removed.

The next victim was Kathleen Lynch, who was looking out through her window. Sartin fired, injuring her shoulder. On Eastfield Avenue Sartin then shot at Brian Thomas, 39, shooting him from his bike. 

Vera Burrows, 75, spoke with the killer at her door, on Eastfield Avenue, and asked him what he was doing. He replied, "It’s me. I am killing people. I am going to kill you." But when he pointed the gun at her he continued: “Oh, you are old, I won’t kill you,” and walked away.

William Reynolds was shot in the back and neck. Husband and wife Peter and Jean Burgon were the next victims, when Sartin shot them in their car. Kathleen Myley, 64, was then shot after she left church.
Ernest Carter was shot in the back of the legs. Then Roy Brown was injured when Sartin fired through the windscreen of his car. Jean Miller, 69, was in her garden on Brantwood Avenue, when Sartin shot her in the stomach.

After firing his final shot Sartin got into his car and drove to Whitley Bay.  Unarmed police officer Danny Herdman was in an unmarked police car and had heard a radio call about the shootings. He saw Sartin’s car and followed it, travelling at 60mph.

Sartin parked in a Whitley Bay car park and emerged from the car without his gun. Herdman then arrested him.

Aftermath
Sartin was charged with the murder of Kenneth Mackintosh in Windsor Road, Monkseaton, and 16 counts of attempted murder. In May 1996, he appeared at Durham Crown Court where he pleaded not guilty by reason of insanity and he was subsequently detained indefinitely at a secure mental unit.

See also

List of massacres in Great Britain
List of rampage killers
List of mass shootings in the United Kingdom

Sources

References

1989 murders in the United Kingdom
1989 in England
1989 mass shootings in Europe
1980s mass shootings in the United Kingdom
20th century in Tyne and Wear
April 1989 crimes
April 1989 events in the United Kingdom
Crime in Tyne and Wear
Deaths by firearm in England
History of the Metropolitan Borough of North Tyneside
Mass shootings in England
Spree shootings in the United Kingdom